The Australia women's national soccer team is overseen by the governing body for soccer in Australia, Football Australia, which is currently a member of the Asian Football Confederation (AFC) and the regional ASEAN Football Federation (AFF) since leaving the Oceania Football Confederation (OFC) in 2006. The team's official nickname is "the Matildas" (from the Australian folk song Waltzing Matilda), having been known as the "Female Socceroos" before 1995.

Australia is a three-time OFC champion, one-time AFC champion and one-time AFF champion, and became the first ever national team to win in two different confederations (before the men's team did the same in 2015 AFC Asian Cup). The team has represented Australia at the FIFA Women's World Cup on seven occasions and at the Olympic Games on four, although it has won neither tournament. Immediately following the 2020 Tokyo Olympics, Australia was ranked eleventh in the world by FIFA.

Australia will co-host the 2023 FIFA Women's World Cup along with New Zealand, so the Matildas automatically qualify for this event as co-hosts.

History

Foundation 
The Australian Women's Soccer Association (AWSA) was founded in 1974 and a representative Australian team competed at the following year's Asian Women's Championship. This team was officially recognised in 2022, with all 16 members of the squad officially awarded caps. Pat O’Connor captained this team with her husband Joe the coach. They finished third at the tournament which is now recognised as the first Asian Cup. A national team made up primarily of players from New South Wales and Western Australia was sent to the 1978 inaugural World Women's Invitational Tournament, in Taipei, Taiwan. Australia played against club teams at the tournament and none of the players' appearances counted as official caps. Coached by Jim Selby, the selected players were:  Sandra Brentnall (WA), Julie Dolan (captain, NSW), Julie Clayton (WA), Kim Coates (NSW), Julie Dolan (NSW), Cindy Heydon (NSW), Barbara Kozak (WA), Sharon Loveless (WA), Toni McMahon (NSW), Sue Monteath (QLD), Sharon Pearson (NSW), Judy Pettitt (WA), Anna Senjuschenko (WA), Teresa Varadi (WA), Leigh Wardell (NSW) and Monika Werner (VIC).

Australia's first official international match was against New Zealand at Seymour Shaw Park, Miranda, New South Wales, Australia on Saturday 6 October 1979, as it was billed as the "1st Australian Women's International Soccer Test". The Australian team listed in the match programme was Sue Monteath (Qld), Shona Bass (Vic), Kim Coates (Vic), Dianna Hall (SA), Carla Grims (SA), Fiana McKenzie (SA), Sandra Brentnall (WA), Judith Pettit (WA), Sharon Mateljan (WA), Julie Clayton (WA), Cindy Heydon (NSW), Julie Dolan (NSW), Toni McMahon (NSW), Jamie Rosman (NSW), Rosie van Bruinessen (NSW) and Leigh Wardell (NSW). Jim Selby remained as coach and the managers were Noelene Stanley and Elaine Watson. A lack of resources meant Australia's first eight official matches were all against New Zealand.

The 1980s: Development in Oceania
Australia played in the first Oceania Cup in 1983 at New Caledonia, losing the final to New Zealand in extra time. It was the first time the Australians faced a team other than the "Football Ferns" of New Zealand. A team would not be assembled again until the next edition of the tournament in 1986 tournament in New Zealand, which featured Australia, New Zealand and Taiwan, as well as New Zealand's B team. Australia lost in the final again, beaten 4–1 by Taiwan.

The late 80s had Australia encountering the American and European teams for the first time in the 1987 Women's World Invitational Tournament in Taiwan, and the 1988 FIFA Women's Invitation Tournament in China. For the latter tournament, the players had to sew themselves the own Australian crests onto the team tracksuits. Hosting the 1989 Oceania Cup in Brisbane, the Australians finished third (A team) and fourth (B team). The 1991 tournament doubled as qualifiers for the 1991 FIFA Women's World Cup, and the winner was determined by the best results from a group. Australia finished level on points with New Zealand, but had scored fewer goals, which resulted in New Zealand progressed to the World Cup as OFC representative.

The 1990s: Continued growth
Between 1991 and 1994, the Matildas played internationally during a tour of Russia in 1994. The Oceania tournament in 1994 again doubled as World Cup qualifiers in the same round-robin format.  Again, Australia finished even with New Zealand on points but this time had a superior goal difference, and qualified for their first FIFA Women's World Cup.

Before 1995, the nickname for the women's team was just "Female Socceroos", derivative of the male squad. Thus in 1995 the Australian Women's Soccer Association joined with Special Broadcasting Service to broadcast a naming competition for the female team. Out of five names, the popular vote chose "Matildas", from the song "Waltzing Matilda". The players themselves did not approve of the name, and took years to use the moniker to describe the team.

At the 1995 FIFA Women's World Cup in Sweden, Australia were grouped with the United States, China and Denmark. During their opening match against Denmark, they lost 5–0. During the team's second match, a 4–2 loss to China, Angela Iannotta scored Australia's first goal at a World Cup. In the final group match against cup holders the United States, Australia scored first but went on to lose 4–1.

The Matildas would assert their Continental strength at the 1998 Oceania Cup, which doubled as a World Cup qualifying tournament.  Australia thrashed their Pacific island opposition in their group games and semi-final, before defeating hosts New Zealand in the final 3–1 (the only goal conceded for the tournament), and qualifying for the 1999 FIFA Women's World Cup in USA.  At the tournament, Australia was grouped with Sweden, China and Ghana.  In their opening match, they secured their first non-loss in a World Cup match with a 1–1 draw against the Ghanaians.  Their following group matches were both 3–1 losses, finishing third in the group, but showing improvement on previous tournaments.

Australia still did not have much attention and respect, with the Matildas forced to train with second-hand equipment from the Socceroos, not getting paid and with few games to play. To promote themselves and raise funds for the team, in 1999 the Matildas posed nude for a calendar, which sold over 40,000 units.

2000–2004: First Olympics appearances
The profile built for the sport carried into 2000, where the Matildas had a guaranteed spot for the 2000 Olympics in Sydney. While in January a friendly match against the Czech Republic in Melbourne's Bob Jane Stadium attracted only 1,500 spectators, a crowd of 10,000 came to the Matildas' game against China at the Sydney Football Stadium in June. Much anticipation surrounded the team's Olympic performance on home soil, but a 3–0 loss to Germany in their opening game brought those hopes down.  A draw with Sweden and a final loss to Brazil ended their tournament in the first round.  While the on-field performance was disappointing, attendances at matches were high for women's soccer in Australia, raising the profile of the game.

The team were the host nation for an annual invitational tournament called the Australia Cup, from 1999 to 2004 inclusive, winning it twice.

Following the Olympics, many problems halted the Matildas' schedules. As Ernie Merrick backed out on his intentions to coach the team, Adrian Santrac only took over as manager in November, and Australia played no games in 2001. The following year the team argued over the calendar proceeds with the promoter, and AWSA went defunct, being absorbed by Soccer Australia (current Football Federation Australia). In-between, many players opted to retire from the national team.

In 2003, they won the Oceania Cup and qualified for the 2003 FIFA Women's World Cup, where they finished in the first round.

The team won the 2004 OFC Women's Olympic Qualifying Tournament in Fiji to return to Olympic tournament in Athens 2004. The Matildas won their first Olympic game ever against Greece, and managed to qualify for the quarterfinals, losing to Sweden 2–1.

2005–2009: Move to Asia 
In 2006, Australia moved from the Oceania Football Confederation to the Asian Football Confederation, and the country was given hosting rights to the AFC Women's Asian Cup that same year. The opening game for the Matildas was against South Korea. An early own goal by South Korea put the Matilda's up, finishing with 3 goals in the second half to give them a 4–0 win. The second match against Myanmar was also a win to the Matildas, who finished with 2 goals, with Sally Shipard and Lisa De Vanna scoring one a piece. The Matildas went on to reach the final, being defeated 4–2 on penalties by China after having a two-goal half time lead.

2007 FIFA Women's World Cup, China
Australia qualified for the 2007 FIFA Women's World Cup and drawn into Group C.  They defeated Ghana 4–1 on 12 September in Hangzhou, followed by a 1–1 draw against Norway at the same venue on 15 September.  Thanks to a late goal from Cheryl Salisbury, they drew against Canada 2–2 on 20 September in Chengdu to advance to the knockout round for the first time in team history.  Australia came up against Brazil in their elimination match, losing to Brazil 3–2 to end their 2007 World Cup run at the quarter-final stage.

2008 Olympics Qualifiers and AFC Women's Asian Cup, Vietnam

The Matildas failed to get through qualifiers for the 2008 Olympics held in 2007, where they lost to Korea DPR both home and away in the final round.

In 2008, the Matildas competed in the 2008 AFC Women's Asian Cup. They were drawn in Group B, placing second in the group with relative ease behind Japan, who they would eventually face in the third place playoff. With the Matildas progressing from the group stage to the semi-finals, they were paired up against Korea DPR. Korea DPR won the match 3–0 and went on to win the tournament. This led them on to the third place playoff, facing Japan for a second time in the tournament and again losing, leaving the Matildas in fourth place.

2010–2013

2010 AFC Women's Asian Cup, China 

In 2010, the Matildas qualified for the 2010 AFC Women's Asian Cup in China. They beat Vietnam (2–0) and South Korea (3–1) before losing to China 1–0 which made them advance in second place and advance to the Semi-finals where they beat Japan 1–0. The final which was played in wet conditions was history making itself with it being the first senior soccer team (men or women) to make a final in the AFC. They created more history by being the first ever Australian soccer team to win in Asia after beating the team of Korea DPR in penalties during the final, 5–4, after a regular time score of 1–1 (Australia's lone and equalising goal being scored by Sam Kerr). The title gave the Matildas a berth at the 2011 FIFA Women's World Cup in Germany.

2011 FIFA Women's World Cup, Germany

The following year the team contested the 2011 FIFA Women's World Cup, held in Germany, being sorted into Group D. Despite losing 1–0 to Brazil in the opening game, victories of 3–2 and 2–1 over Equatorial Guinea and Norway respectively qualified the Matildas to the quarterfinals. At the knockout stage, the team lost 3–1 to Sweden. Caitlin Foord was awarded Best Young Player of the tournament, and defender Elise Kellond-Knight was chosen for the All-Star Team.

2014–2019: Stajcic Era 
After operating as interim head coach of the Matildas in late April and May 2014 for the Matildas’ Asian Cup campaign. In 2014, Alen Stajcic was appointed permanent head coach of the squad in late 2014.

2014 AFC Women's Asian Cup, Vietnam 
In 2014, the Matildas qualified for the 2014 AFC Women's Asian Cup in Vietnam. They drawn in Group A alongside Japan, Vietnam and Jordan, earning 2 victories and a draw with Japan which earnt them second place on goal difference. They were drawn against South Korea in the semi-finals, defeating them 2–1, but ultimately lost 1–0 to Japan in the final.

2015 FIFA Women's World Cup, Canada 
During the 2015 FIFA Women's World Cup, held in Canada, they became the first Australian team, men's or women's, to win a knockout stage match at a World Cup when they defeated Brazil by a score of 1–0. The goal was scored by Kyah Simon after a shot by Lisa de Vanna was blocked and redirected by goalkeeper Luciana. In the quarterfinals, the Matildas lost to defending champions Japan in a late goal by Mana Iwabuchi.

2016 Olympic Games, Rio
The following year, they contested in qualifiers for the 2016 Summer Olympics where they finished on top of the group after defeating all of the opponents bar China, to get to the Olympic Games. Drawn in Group F, Australia lost to Canada, conceded a draw to Germany, and defeated Zimbabwe in a blowout to finish as the best third placed team. The adversary in the quarterfinals were hosts Brazil, who avenged the defeat one year prior in the penalty shootouts as goalkeeper Bárbara saved Alanna Kennedy's kick.

Post 2016 Olympics 
At the 2017 Tournament of Nations event, the Matildas recorded their first ever win over the United States after 27 attempts, defeating them 1–0 in Seattle. The Matildas went on to defeat Japan 4–2 and Brazil 6–1 to finish as the inaugural tournament champions. Following the Tournament of Nations, the Matildas scheduled a series of two friendlies hosting Brazil, with the first match at Penrith Stadium being sold-out, and an even larger crowd of nearly 17,000 attending the next match 3 days later in Newcastle.

In December 2017, Matildas were awarded the Public Choice Team of the Year at the Australian Institute of Sport Awards.

2018 AFC Women's Asian Cup, Jordan 
At the 2018 AFC Asian Cup, held in Jordan, Australia reached the final after defeating Thailand in the semi-final on penalty kicks. They would lose 1–0 to Japan in the final, but nonetheless secured a spot at the 2019 FIFA Women's World Cup.

Post 2018 Asian Cup 
Later that year at the 2018 Tournament of Nations Australia once again went undefeated, finishing the tournament with two wins and one draw. They were tied with the United States with 7 points, but the US had a superior goal differential and were crowned tournament champions.

2019–2020: Milicic Era 

Despite entering 2019 on the back of good form and with their highest ever placement on the FIFA ranking list (4th), the Matildas coach Alen Stajcic was sacked from the role in January 2019 by Football Federation Australia (FFA), whose chief executive David Gallop said the decision was based on confidential surveys and conversations with players and staff. The decision proved to be very controversial, as the FFA refused to discuss any further specifics as to the reasoning for the decision and was made only months out from a World Cup appearance. Some players, such as Sam Kerr, Lydia Williams and Elise Kellond-Knight spoke in support of Stajcic and voiced their surprise at his sacking. Former men's national team assistant Ante Milicic was later appointed coach.

2019 FIFA Women's World Cup, France
For the 2019 FIFA Women's World Cup, held in France, Australia was drawn in Group C with Italy, Brazil, and Jamaica. A 2–1 injury time loss to Italy was followed by a 3–2 win against Brazil. This victory was notable for 3 reasons – Australia came back from a 2–0 deficit, these were the first goals conceded by Brazil in the group stage in 16 years and it was their first group stage loss for 24 years. The final group game was a 4–1 win over Jamaica with Sam Kerr scoring all four goals, becoming the first Australian player — male or female — to score a hat trick at a World Cup tournament. The result saw Australia finish second in the group and proceed to play Norway in the round of sixteen. The game finished one-all after both regulation time and extra time with Norway winning the penalty shoot-out 4–1.

2020–present: Gustavsson Era 
In September 2020, Football Federation Australia named Swede and former United States Women's National Soccer Team assistant coach Tony Gustavsson as the Matildas' new head coach, signing him on a deal running through 2024 (up to and including the 2024 Olympics in Paris).

2020 Olympic Games, Tokyo
In 2020, the Matildas qualified for the delayed 2020 Summer Olympics where they finished top of all competing nations during the 2020 Asian Football Confederation's Qualifying Tournament. They were placed in Group G with countries Sweden, the United States, and New Zealand, nicknamed the 'Group of Death.' After beating New Zealand, losing to Sweden, and drawing with the United States, they were ranked third in their group and progressed to the quarter finals against Great Britain. The match saw Australia open the scoring with a 1-goal advantage, before Great Britain surpassed them with a 1-goal advantage in the second half. An 89th-minute goal by captain Sam Kerr saw Australia equalise before advancing to extra time. During the extra 30 minutes of play, Mary Fowler and Kerr scored an additional two goals to bring the score to 4–2, before Ellen White completed her hat trick. The game ended with a 4–3 scoreline, resulting in Australia's first entry into an Olympic semi-final, playing against Sweden for the second time in the tournament.  Despite a strong performance and a disallowed goal by Kerr, they lost 1–0, relegating them to a bronze medal match playoff against the United States. The semi-final match against Sweden broke women's sport TV viewing records in Australia, with 2.32 million viewers tuning in. In the bronze medal match, they lost 4–3 to the United States, resulting in the Matilda's 7th loss of the year. Finishing fourth, the 2020 Olympics were the Matildas' most successful performance at the Olympics, having previously never progressed beyond the quarter-finals since its inception in 1996.

Post 2020 Olympics 
After their Olympics bronze medal defeat, Australia played their first ever match against the Republic of Ireland on 21 September 2021, with it being Sam Kerr's 100th cap. In October, they played a series of home friendlies against Brazil, their first matches on home soil since 2019, recording a win and a draw. In November, in their final matches of the 2021 calendar year, they played another series of home friendlies against World Number 1 side the United States, recording a defeat and a draw. These two matches broke attendance records in Australia – the first match played on the 27 November in Stadium Australia, Sydney, broke the all-time standalone Matildas home attendance record set in 2000, with 36,109 spectators. The second game broke the attendance record of any Matildas game played at Newcastle, with 20,495 spectators. 2021 also saw a record number of Matildas' debutants, with 13 players making their first senior international caps, and a record number of players reaching the 100th cap milestones, including Emily Van Egmond, Kyah Simon, Sam Kerr, Alanna Kennedy and Tameka Yallop.

2022 AFC Women's Asian Cup, India 
The Matildas began 2022 by participating in the 2022 AFC Women's Asian Cup, held in India. They were drawn into Group B, against Indonesia, Philippines and Thailand. They played their opening match against Indonesia, beating them 18–0, a record win for the team against any opponent within the Asian confederation. The game also saw Sam Kerr scoring 5 goals, whereby equalling and surpassing Tim Cahill's previous Australian international goal-scoring record of 50 goals, making Kerr the all-time leading scorer for Australia, both male or female. Australia finished top in their group undefeated, conceding just one solitary goal, however the team crashed out in the quarter-finals to eventual runners-up South Korea 0–1. Despite the tournament serving as the Asian qualification stage for the 2023 FIFA Women's World Cup, Australia will still participate despite not passing the quarter-finals, as the country is one of the hosts of the upcoming competition.

2023 FIFA Women's World Cup
Australia will co-host the 2023 FIFA Women's World Cup along with New Zealand, after the bidding decision was announced on 25 June 2020. As hosts, Australia were drawn into Group B, a group which also contains Canada, Nigeria, and debutant Ireland. 

Before the tournament, Australia participated in the 2023 Cup of Nations alongside Spain, Jamaica, and the Czech Republic. Australia has already defeated Czech Republic 4-0 in their opening game and Spain 3-2 in their second game, only needing a draw in their game against Jamaica to win the tournament.

Team image
Regarded as Australia's most beloved national sporting team in 2019, the Matildas have grown its fanbase over recent years, due to increased exposure, successful tournaments and skilled players coming on to play both internationally and at club level, including captain Sam Kerr, widely regarded as one of the world's best female soccer players.

Nicknames
The team's official nickname is "the Matildas" (from the Australian folk song Waltzing Matilda), having been known as the "Female Socceroos" before 1995.

Naming Rights
Under a naming rights deal with Scentre Group and its predecessor, Westfield Group, the team was branded as "Westfield Matildas" from 2008 to 2021. The team is currently branded as "Commonwealth Bank Matildas", based on a multi-year financial investment in the team by the Commonwealth Bank.

Media coverage
Australian matches are broadcast by Paramount+ and on free-to-air by Network 10. In 2021, during the broadcast of the Tokyo 2020 Olympics, the Matildas broke TV viewing records of any women's team sport in history. The record was initially broken during their second group stage match against Sweden, drawing in 1,468,000 viewers. The record was broken again during their quarter-final clash against Great Britain, drawing in 2.27 million viewers, before recording the all-time record of 2.32 million viewers watching them compete against Sweden in the Olympic semi-final.

Attendance 
The current home attendance record for a Matilda's stand-alone match is 36,109, set on 27 November 2021 in Sydney during a friendly match against the United States. A following friendly on 30 November in Newcastle broke the Newcastle attendance record, with 20,495 spectators.

FIFA world rankings

 Best Ranking   Best Mover   Worst Ranking   Worst Mover

Results and fixtures

Historical results

The following is a list of match results in the last 12 months, as well as any future matches that have been scheduled.

Legend

2022

2023

Coaching staff

Current coaching staff

Manager history
.

Players

Current squad
The following 25 players were named to the squad for the 2023 Cup of Nations against Spain, Czech Republic and Jamaica from 16 to 22 February.

Caps and goals are current as of 22 February 2023 after the match against Jamaica.

Recent call-ups
The following players have been called up to the squad within the last 12 months.

Notes:
 INJ Withdrew due to an injury.
 PRE Preliminary squad / on stand-by.

Player records

Players in bold are still active, at least at club level.

Most caps

Most goals

Most clean sheets

Captains

Honours

Major tournaments
OFC Women's Championship
  Champions: 1994, 1998, 2003
  Runners-up: 1983, 1986, 1991

AFF Women's Championship
  Champions: 2008
AFC Women's Asian Cup
  Champions: 2010
  Runners-up: 2006, 2014, 2018

Minor tournaments
 Champions: Australia Cup – 1999, 2001, 2002
 Champions: 2013 Centenary Cup
 Champions: 2017 Tournament of Nations
 Champions: 2019 Cup of Nations
 Champions: 2023 Cup of Nations

Competitive record

Australia has played matches against international opponents on a consistent basis since 1978. To date, they have played 53 different nations and governing bodies, across FIFA World Cups, invitational tournaments, the OFC Women's Nations Cup (until 2004), the AFC Women's Asian Cup (from 2006) and international friendlies.

FIFA Women's World Cup

Olympic Games

OFC Women's Nations Cup

AFC Women's Asian Cup

 An Australian representative side participated in the 1975 AFC Women's Championship however these games are not recognised as official Australian international fixtures. The participants were the NSW State Team that the organisers had labelled as Australia.
 The 1980 AFC Women's Championship had a team representing Western Australia, but not the Australian National Team.

AFF Women's Championship

Minor Tournaments

Algarve Cup
The Algarve Cup is an invitational tournament for national teams in women's association football hosted by the Portuguese Football Federation (FPF). Held annually in the Algarve region of Portugal since 1994, it is one of the most prestigious and longest-running women's international football events and has been nicknamed the "Mini FIFA Women's World Cup".

Cyprus Cup 
The Cyprus Women's Cup is a global invitational tournament for national teams in women's football. It has been held annually in Cyprus since 2008.

Peace Queen Cup 
The Peace Queen Cup was an invitational women's association football tournament for national teams organised by the Sunmoon Peace Football Foundation.

Tournament of Nations
The Tournament of Nations was a global invitational tournament for national teams in women's football hosted in the United States in non-World Cup and non-Olympic years.

Cup of Nations
The Cup of Nations is a global invitational tournament for national teams in women's football hosted in Australia.

See also

 Australia men's national soccer team
Sport in Australia
Soccer in Australia
Women's soccer in Australia
A-League Women – Current Australian women's national league
Women's National Soccer League (WNSL) – defunct Australian women's national league

References

Bibliography

External links

 
 FIFA profile
 Match Tracker – Andrew Howe – FFA Statistician

 
Oceanian women's national association football teams
Asian women's national association football teams